David Frankel (born 1959) is an American film director, screenwriter and producer.

David Frankel may also refer to:
 David Frankel (entrepreneur) (born 1970), South African internet entrepreneur
 David Frankel (archaeologist), Australian archaeologist
 David S. Frankel (born 1950),  American information technology expert